M. J. Ward Feed Mill Complex is a national historic district located at Bath in Steuben County, New York. The district is a single property containing a three-story feed mill and store (1909) with attached grain handling and storage facilities (1976), a storage barn (ca 1870), and a residence (ca. 1870).

It was listed on the National Register of Historic Places in 1991.

References

Grinding mills on the National Register of Historic Places in New York (state)
Historic districts on the National Register of Historic Places in New York (state)
Italianate architecture in New York (state)
Buildings and structures in Steuben County, New York
National Register of Historic Places in Steuben County, New York